Cheese Chasers is a 1951 Warner Bros. Cartoons Merrie Melodies cartoon directed by Chuck Jones and written by Michael Maltese. The cartoon was released on August 25, 1951 and stars Hubie and Bertie, with Claude Cat.

Plot
At the end of a raid on The Hunka Cheese Co. (a cheese factory), Hubie determines to Bertie that, based on the amount of cheese the average mouse eats in a lifetime (12 lbs.), they have eaten enough in one night to have lived 2,000 years (48 tons). Claiming that they will never be able to even touch cheese again, and thus believing that they have nothing left to live for, Hubie and Bertie become suicidal and try to get eaten by Claude Cat. They open the sleeping Claude's mouth, step into it, and then close it with them still inside. The cat wakes up, thinks "SOMETHING ROTTEN IN DENMARK" (with a white sign with "SOMETHING ROTTEN IN" and an arrow in red over Denmark, under Norway and Sweden), and the mice beg him to eat them. Claude says that he must be dreaming and sticks himself with a pin to wake himself up, screaming in pain. Commenting on what a horrible dream he had, Claude laughs it off and tries to go back to sleep. Hubie and Bertie again enter Claude's mouth and beg him to eat them. Realizing that it is not a dream, the cat cringes in fear in a corner and asks the mice what he ever did to them. When Hubie and Bertie insist that all they want is for him to eat them, Claude  says that he does not want to eat them. When he offers the mice a hunk of cheese, they recoil and tell him to take it away. Confused, the cat consults a book called Mental Illnesses: Their Cause and Cure. He finally finds the page he is looking for, folds it into a three-cornered hat and assumes a Napoleon pose.

Realizing they have to get tough with the cat, the mice, carrying a hammer, find Claude inside a glass bottle, building a model ship from the outside (Claude breaks the fourth wall and says to the audience that it is said that a hobby sometimes helps). Smashing the bottle, Hubie asks Claude if he is going to eat them or not. When the cat refuses, he brings the hammer down hard on Claude's foot, angering him enough to grab them and try to eat them. When he realizes the danger of this, thinking of a red wigwag with the word "DANGER" on it in white, the cat spits the mice out one at a time and runs out the front door, slamming it behind him. Claude finally concludes that he will never again be able to eat mice, that he has nothing left to live for, and also decides to commit suicide. Claude heads outside and punches a bulldog in the front yard, who runs out barking in anger. Then he looks back and sees Claude waiting for him, blindfolded and smoking a cigarette. Confronting Claude, he asks, "Hey, cat, what gives? Why don'tcha run? Don'tcha know I'm gonna massacre ya?", to which Claude says, "Yes", and asks him to do it.

The bulldog tells Claude to not give him any trouble. When Claude continues to beg the bulldog to "massacre" him, the bulldog thinks "SOMETHING DECIDEDLY FISHY HERE" (with a wooden sign with "SOMETHING DECIDEDLY FISHY HERE" in red pointing to a fishbowl with three goldfish), and the mice come running out of the house and once again beg Claude to eat them. The bulldog asks Claude if cats eat mice, which he denies ("No!"), and asks Herbie and Bertie if mice eat cheese, which they also deny ("Cheese? Ahh! Don't mention that word!"). The bulldog tries to figure out why Claude no longer wants to eat mice and the mice do not want to eat cheese anymore. Finding out, using an adding machine, in the end that "It just don't add up!", he runs after a passing dog catcher truck, now wanting to get committed ("Hey, wait for me! Wait for baby!"), with Claude ("Hey, wait for me! You gotta massacre me!") and the mice ("Wait, you cowardly cat!") following after him, all three of them still wanting to end their own lives.

Legacy
This is the first appearance of the bulldog that would become Marc Antony in Feed the Kitty (1952), Kiss Me Cat (1953), Cat Feud (1958), and Feline Frame-Up (1954).

The plot resembles that of the 1945 cartoon, Life with Feathers, directed by Friz Freleng and written by Tedd Pierce, which marked the first appearance of Sylvester the Cat in his mature form.  In that short, a jilted suicidal Lovebird repeatedly tries to get Sylvester to eat him, and a paranoid Sylvester refuses, believing the bird is trying to poison him.

Home media
Looney Tunes Golden Collection: Volume 2 (DVD set)
Looney Tunes Mouse Chronicles: The Chuck Jones Collection (DVD set)

References

External links

1951 films
1951 animated films
1951 short films
Merrie Melodies short films
Short films directed by Chuck Jones
1950s Warner Bros. animated short films
Animated films about mice
Animated films about cats
Animated films about dogs
Films scored by Carl Stalling
Warner Bros. Cartoons animated short films
Films about suicide
Films with screenplays by Michael Maltese
1950s English-language films
Claude Cat films
Hubie and Bertie films